Grand Fleet is a 1988 video game published by Simulations Canada.

Gameplay
Grand Fleet is a game in which players are echelon commanders onboard the flagships of their respective fleet – the British Home Fleet based at Scapa Flow in the Orkney islands, and the German Fleet, called the High Seas Fleet, based in Jade Bay and in the estuaries of the Weser and Elbe rivers.

Reception
Lt. H.E. Dille reviewed the game for Computer Gaming World, and stated that "Overall, this product is recommended for dedicated wargamers and enthusiasts of the historical period covered, but may prove too involved and time-consuming for "weekend warriors"."

Reviews
The Games Machine – Sep, 1989
Atari ST User – Oct, 1989
Computer Gaming World – Nov, 1991
ST Format #5

References

1988 video games
Amiga games
Atari ST games
Computer wargames
DOS games
Naval video games
Simulations Canada video games
Turn-based strategy video games
Video games developed in Canada
World War I video games